Fluminense Football Club, known as Fluminense, is a Brazilian sports club best known for its professional football team that competes in the Campeonato Brasileiro Série A, the first tier of Brazilian football and the Campeonato Carioca, the state league of Rio de Janeiro. The club is based in the neighbourhood of Laranjeiras since its foundation, in 1902. Fluminense is the oldest football club of Rio de Janeiro.

The club was founded on 21 July 1902 and Oscar Cox was its first elected president. Fluminense have since been crowned national champions four times, most recently in the 2012 Campeonato Brasileiro Série A, the team have also won the 2007 Copa do Brasil, the 1999 Campeonato Brasileiro Série C and the 1952 Intercontinental Cup. In 1949, Fluminense became the first football club in the world to receive the Olympic Cup, awarded annually by the International Olympic Committee to an institution or association with a record of merit and integrity in actively developing the Olympic Movement. Its best international performances are finishing runner-up in the 2008 Copa Libertadores and 2009 Copa Sudamericana.

Fluminense is a demonym for people indigenous to the state of Rio de Janeiro, in Brazil. Although football was its original endeavour, the club is today an umbrella organisation for several teams in more than 16 different sport activities. 

Fluminense's traditional home kit consists of an iconic combination of three colors: garnet, white and green, disposal in vertical stripes, since its adoption, in 1904. Along with white shorts and white socks, an outfit which has been in use since 1920, that's the typical home kit for the Tricolor.

The club holds several long-standing rivalries with other clubs, most notably with Flamengo (Clássico Fla-Flu), as well as with Botafogo (Clássico Vovô) and Vasco da Gama (Clássico dos Gigantes). The Clássico Fla-Flu is widely considered the greatest football derby of Brazil, and host several attendance records, as the two highest attended matches in any football club tier, with almost 200.000 supporters in Maracanã.

The club is the birthplace of the Brazil national football team, which played its first game midst the celebrations of the 12th anniversary of the club. In Fluminense's ground, the Stadium of Laranjeiras, the Canarinhos held their first ever match, scored their first ever goal and lifted their first ever trophy. Until today, the club has contributed the fifth-most players to the national team among all Brazilian clubs.

History
Fluminense Football Club was founded on 21 July 1902 in the neighbourhood of Laranjeiras in the city of Rio de Janeiro by a group of young football enthusiasts led by Oscar Cox, a Brazilian of English descent who had come into contact with the sport whilst studying in Europe.

The first official match was played against now defunct Rio Football Club, and Fluminense won 8–0. The club's first title came in 1906, when Fluminense won the Campeonato Carioca.

In 1911, disagreement between Fluminense players led to the formation of Flamengo's football team. The so-called Fla-Flu derby is considered one of the biggest in the history of Brazilian football. Three years later, in Fluminense's stadium, the Brazil national football team debuted, against touring English club Exeter City. It was also there that they won their debut title, in 1919.

By 1922, Fluminense had 4,000 members, a stadium for 25,000 people, and facilities that impressed clubs in Europe.

The following years saw an expansion of the club's hegemony in Rio. Fluminense would remain unsurpassed in terms of state championships until 2009. International acclaim came in 1949 with the awarding of the Olympic Cup, and was further fostered in 1952 with Fluminense's World-wide honour, the Copa Rio. The club established itself regionally with victory in two Torneio Rio-São Paulo cups in 1957 and 1960. National honors followed in 1970, 1984, 2010 and 2012 with Taça de Prata and Série A cups, respectively, also taking the Cup in Brazil in 2007 and the Brasileirão Série C in 1999.

From the 1950s, with the creation of the Rio-São Paulo Tournament, the forerunner of what eventually would become the national championship, Fluminense established itself regionally by winning the tournament title in the years of 1957 and 1960.

From the 1960s, the first national championships began to be played in Brazil. Fluminense's first national title came in 1970; at that time, Brazil had the best players in world football, and all of them played in Brazilian clubs. Although its squad was not counted among the main contenders of the season in Brazil, Fluminense won the Brazilian championship and surpassed the great strengths of the time in Santos, Palmeiras and Cruzeiro.

In the 1970s, Fluminense signed several famous players like Roberto Rivellino. This time, called "Maquina Tricolor", they won the state championship in the years of 1975 and 1976. In the national championship, Fluminense lost in the semifinal matches to Internacional in 1975 and Corinthians in 1976.

Fluminense again became Brazilian champions in 1984. This time, they won the State Championship in the years of 1983, 1984, and 1985 with players like Romerito, Ricardo Gomes, Deley, and the "Casal Vinte": Assis and Washington.

At the end of the 1980s, Copa do Brasil was created, inspired by the Cup tournaments played in European countries. Fluminense reached the final of the Copa do Brasil for the first time in 1992, but lost to Internacional de Porto Alegre.

A disastrous campaign led to Fluminense's relegation from Brasileirão Série A in 1996. However, a set of off-field political manoeuvres not performed by the club allowed them to remain in Brazil's top domestic league, only to be relegated the next year. Completely out of control, the club was relegated from Série B to Série C in 1998. In 1999, Fluminense won the Série C championship and were to be promoted to Série B when they were invited to take part in Copa João Havelange, a championship that replaced the traditional Série A in 2000. In 2001, it was decided that all clubs which took part in Copa João Havelange's so-called Blue Group should be kept in Série A.

In 2002, 2005 and 2012, Fluminense won the Campeonato Carioca again. In 2005, Fluminense reached the final of the Copa do Brasil again, but lost to Paulista Futebol Clube.

In 2007, Fluminense won the Copa do Brasil after beating Figueirense in the final, and was admitted to the Copa Libertadores again after 23 years. The club's campaign saw them reach the final and included remarkable matches against Arsenal de Sarandí, São Paulo and the Boca Juniors. Fluminense lost the final to LDU Quito in a penalty shootout.

After signing 27 players and going through 5 different managers in 2009, Fluminense found themselves struggling to avoid another relegation from Série A. With less than one-third of the championship left, the mathematical probability of the club's relegation was 98%. At this point, manager Cuca decided to dispense with some of the more experienced players and gave Fluminense's youngsters a chance. That, along with Fred's recovery from a serious injury and substantial support from the fans, allowed not only a sensational escape from relegation, but also placed Fluminense in the final of the Copa Sudamericana. For the second year in a row, the club contested a continental cup. In a repeat of the previous year's Copa Libertadores, Fluminense lost the final to LDU Quito.

In 2010, Fluminense won the Brazilian championship for the third time in their history, marking their third national championship after 1970 and 1984. It was also the fourth title for coach Muricy Ramalho in a decade: Ramalho had won the title three times in a row with São Paulo from 2006 to 2008. Darío Conca was named the Brazilian Championship's Player of the Season, while Fred and Washington were decisive players in Fluminense's winning campaign.

On 23 May 2012, Fluminense lost the semifinal qualification match to Boca Juniors from Argentina, for the continental club football cup, Copa Libertadores. Later that year, on 11 November, they won their fourth Brazilian championship after defeating the near-relegated Palmeiras 3–2.
Fluminense won the Série A for the fourth time on 11 November 2012.

In December 2013, a draw with Bahia in the last round of the 2013 Campeonato Brasileiro Série A had Fluminense mathematically relegated to Série B. However, irregular lineups by Portuguesa and Fluminense's main rivals Flamengo in their matches against Grêmio and Cruzeiro respectively caused both teams to lose 4 points after a trial in STJD (Brazil's governing football jury). That allowed Fluminense to stay in Série A, with Portuguesa being relegated instead and Flamengo ending the championship as the last non-relegated club.

Performance

Fluminense have taken part in 47 of the 49 official Serie A championships organized in Brazil since 1971.

Records

Highest attendances – Maracanã
 1. Fluminense 0-0 Flamengo, 1963 194,603 ¹
 2. Fluminense 3–2 Flamengo, 1969 171,599
 3. Fluminense 1–0 Botafogo, 1971 160,000
 4. Fluminense 0–0 Flamengo, 1976 155,116
 5. Fluminense 1–0 Flamengo, 1984 153,520
 6. Fluminense 1–1 Corinthians, 1976 146,043
¹: 177,656 paying, a record for persons present at Maracanã stadium.

Highest average attendance at public competition for Fluminense
 Largest average attendance in the Copa Libertadores (RJ): 52,801 (49,011 paying, 2008)
 Largest average attendance in the Copa Sudamericana (RJ): 29,357 (27,318 paying, 2009)
 Largest average attendance in international tournaments (RJ): 48,797 (37,541 paying, Copa Rio, 1952)
 Largest average attendance in national championships (RJ): 43,541 paying (1976)
 Largest average attendance in the Tournament Roberto Gomes Pedrosa (RJ): 40,408 paying (1970)
 Largest average attendance in the Brazil Cup (RJ): 27,123 paying (2007)
 Largest average attendance in the Rio-São Paulo Tournament (RJ): 33,018 paying (1960)
 Largest average attendance in the state championship: 47,814 paying (1969, all stages)
 Largest average attendance in the state championship in the Maracana Stadium: 93,560 paying (1969, 10 matches)

Support

The supporters of Fluminense Football Club are usually related to the upper classes of Rio de Janeiro. However, the popularity of the club reaches beyond the city limits. Recent polls have estimated the number of supporters to be between 1.3% and 3.7% of the Brazilian population. Considering a population of 185 million people, that would account for numbers between 2.73 and 6.84 million.

The best attendance ever observed in a match of Fluminense was registered on 15 December 1963 in a rally against Flamengo. On that day, an impressive number of 194,000 people showed up at Maracanã stadium. This occasion remains as the stadium's record for a match between clubs.

Notable supporters of Fluminense include composers Cartola and Chico Buarque, FIFA president of honor João Havelange, musician Ivan Lins, poet and actor Mário Lago, journalist and songwriter Nelson Motta, dramatist, journalist and writer Nelson Rodrigues, 1970 FIFA World Cup winner Gérson, Chelsea central defender Thiago Silva, Left-back legend Marcelo, former Minister of Culture Gilberto Gil, Silvio Santos, the owner of SBT, the second largest Brazilian television network, and the Academy Award nominee Fernanda Montenegro.

Honours

Chronology of Main Titles 

Source: Official website of the club .

Fluminense main derbies
 Fla-Flu Derby, also called Derby of Crowds ('Clássico das Multidões'), played with Flamengo;
 Giants' Derby ('Clássico dos Gigantes'); played with Vasco da Gama;
 Grandpa Derby ('Clássico Vovô'), played with Botafogo. The name comes from being the two oldest practicing football clubs among the great clubs of Rio de Janeiro, and this is also the oldest classic in Brazil, because its first game was on October 22, 1905, friendly that the Fluminense won by 6–0.

According to the fluzao.info site, the average paying public at the principal classics of Fluminense played in the Estádio do Maracanã is 60,107 against Flamengo, 43,735 against Vasco, 34,359 against Botafogo, 25,127 against America and 22,527 against Bangu (1950-2010). These statistics could be about 20% higher, given the issues of the distribution of gratuities at Maracanã.

Corinthians vs Fluminense, interstate derby

The derby against Corinthians is perhaps the most representative among the various confrontations with big Brazilian clubs played by Fluminense, given the fact that these clubs often intersect at decisive moments in their seasons.

Statistics

 Records.

Players with most appearances

Top goalscorers

Coaches with most games

Correct as of April 6, 2022

Sponsors
Companies that Fluminense Football Club currently has sponsorship deals with include:

 Umbro 
Betano

Players

Current squad

Reserve team

Out on loan

Staff

Current staff

Head coaches

  Charlie Williams (1911–12)
  Ramón Platero (1919)
  Charlie Williams (1924–26)
  Luiz Vinhaes (1929–33)
  Ondino Viera (1938–43)
  Gentil Cardoso (1945–47)
  Ondino Viera (1948–49)
  Zezé Moreira (1951–54)
  Sylvio Pirillo (1956–58)
  Zezé Moreira (1958–62)
  Tim (1964–67)
  Telê Santana (1969–70)
  Paulo Amaral (1970)
  Mário Zagallo (1971–72)
  Zezé Moreira (1973)
  Didi (1975)
  Carlos Alberto Parreira (1975–78)
  Mário Travaglini (1976–77)
  Paulo Emilio (1978)
  Nelsinho Rosa (1979–81)
  Carbone (1983–84)
  Carlos Alberto Parreira (1984–85)
  José Omar Pastoriza (1985)
  Nelsinho Rosa (1985–86)
  Carbone (1987)
  Paulo Emilio (1990)
  Nelsinho Rosa (1993)
  Renato Gaúcho (1996)
  Hugo de León (1997)
  Carbone (1997–98)
  Carlos Alberto Parreira (1999–00)
  Oswaldo de Oliveira (2001–02)
  Renato Gaúcho (2 September 2002 – 11 July 2003)
  Joel Santana (18 July 2003 1 October 2003)
  Renato Gaúcho (1 October 2003 – 28 December 2003)
  Ricardo Gomes (4 March 2004 – 15 August 2004)
  Alexandre Gama(16 August 2004 - 31 December 2004)
  Abel Braga (1 January 2005 – 10 December 2005)
  Ivo Wortmann (11 December 2005 – 19 February 2006)
  Paulo Campos (22 February 2006 – 12 March 2006)
  Oswaldo de Oliveira (2006)
  Antônio Lopes (23 August 2006 – 29 September 2006)
  PC Gusmão (29 September 2006 – 11 February 2007)
  Renato Gaúcho (24 April 2007 – 10 August 2008)
  Cuca (11 August 2008 – 2 October 2008)
  Renê Simões (2 October 2008 – 6 March 2009)
  Carlos Alberto Parreira (7 March 2009 – 13 July 2009)
  Vinícius Eutrópio (14 July 2009 – 19 July 2009)
  Renato Gaúcho (20 July 2009 – 1 September 2009)
  Cuca (1 September 2009 – 19 April 2010)
  Muricy Ramalho (25 April 2010 – 13 March 2011)
  Enderson Moreira (int.) (21 March 2011 – 31 May 2011)
  Abel Braga (8 June 2011 – 29 July 2013)
  Vanderlei Luxemburgo (30 July 2013 – 12 November 2013)
  Dorival Júnior (12 November 2013 – 26 December 2013)
  Renato Gaúcho (28 December 2013 – 2 April 2014)
  Cristóvão Borges (2 April 2014 – 23 March 2015)
  Ricardo Drubscky (23 March – 17 May 2015)
  Enderson Moreira (18 May 2015 – 16 September 2015)
  Eduardo Baptista (17 September 2015 – 25 February 2016)
  Levir Culpi (4 March 2016 – 6 November 2016)
  Marcão (6 November 2016 – 1 December 2016)
  Abel Braga (1 December 2016 – June 2018)
  Marcelo Oliveira (June 2018 - 29 November 2018)
  Fábio Moreno (last game in Brazilian Championship)
  Fernando Diniz (2018-2019)
  Marcão (one game)
  Oswaldo de Oliveira (2019)
  Marcão (2019)
  Odair Hellmann (2020)
  Marcão (2020–2021)
  Roger Machado (2021)
  Marcão (2021)
  Abel Braga (2022 – 30 April 2022)
  Fernando Diniz (1 May 2022 – present)

See also
2008 Fluminense Football Club season

Notes

References

External links

  
  Flickr: Fluminense Oficial's Photostream – Downloadable Fluminense Photos 
 Fluminense Football Club News at Sambafoot.com  
 Fluminense F.C. Page at Goal.com  
 Fluminense F.C. Fan Page at Soccerway 
 Statistics on major competitions 
 Statistics on all matches between 1902 and 2006 
 NETFLU – Hourly News about Fluminense Football Club 
 Statistics on the 2009 Série A championship 
 Fluminense F.C. daily news in Portuguese 
 Official Fluminense Football Club page at FIFA 
 Fluminense Football Club Page at ESPN Global 
 Fluminense F.C. at The World Game: News, Results & Tables 

 
Association football clubs established in 1902
Football clubs in Rio de Janeiro (state)
Football clubs in Rio de Janeiro (city)
1902 establishments in Brazil
Multi-sport clubs in Brazil
Copa do Brasil winning clubs
Campeonato Brasileiro Série A winning clubs